Shams al-Din Isfahani (died 1249) was a Persian vizier and military commander in medieval Anatolia. He served as deputy (na'eb) to Sultan Kaykhusraw II (1237-1246) of the Seljuk Sultanate of Rum and as the commander-in-chief of his army. After the formal submission of the Sultanate to the Mongol Empire, he became deputy to the Mongol ruler Batu Khan
(1227–1255) in Anatolia. He later reached the apex of his power when he became the new vizier of the Sultanate of Rum, and its de facto ruler for a short period after Kaykhusraw's death.

Life
Following their defeat at the Battle of Köse Dağ, the Seljuks sent a diplomatic mission headed by Shams al-Din Isfahani, the deputy (na'eb) of Kaykhusraw II and the commander-in-chief of the Sultanate's army, to the Mongol ruler Batu Khan. Eventually, Batu allowed Kaykhusraw II to stay in "power" as a subject ruler of the Mongols in return for a significant annual tribute. For his efforts, Isfahani was lavishly rewarded; he was made Batu Khan's deputy in Anatolia. When Kaykhusraw's vizier Mohadhdhab al-Din died, Isfahani became the new vizier of the Sultanate of Rum, thus cementing his power over Anatolia. According to Andrew Peacock: "henceforth the Saljuq sultans were to play a secondary political role, pawns of the officials appointed by competing Mongol factions".

After Kaykhusraw II died in 1246, Isfahani seized "the real power in the sultanate". He installed Kaykhusraw's eldest son, known regnally as Kaykaus II, on the Sultanate's throne. In the meantime, Isfahani had appointed his own allies to key positions within the Sultanate's realm. He also married Kaykhusraw's widow, Prodoulia, which reportedly induced condemnation and antipathy from his contemporaries. According to Bar Hebraeus, the two reportedly had a son, about whom nothing is known.

Things were going well for Isfahani, until Mongol ruler Güyük Khan (1246-1248) decided to confirm Kaykhusraw's second son, known regnally as Kilij Arslan IV, as the new sultan. In all likelihood, Güyük "was probably trying to use this appointment to undermine his rival Batu who had claimed sovereignty over Anatolia".

Death
Isfahani was eventually arrested and murdered in 1249 by supporters of Kilij Arslan IV. He was succeeded by Jalal al-Din Qaratay, one of his former allies.

References

Sources
 
 

1249 deaths
13th-century Iranian people
People from the Sultanate of Rum